is a horizontally scrolling shooter developed and published by Irem. It was released in arcades in 1989. It is the sequel to R-Type, and the second game in the R-Type series.

Gameplay

The player controls a ship called the R-9C, which is an improved version of its predecessor game's ship, the R-9. The ship's design was changed slightly, and the wave cannon was given a new charge level. Two new types of weapons (the Search Laser and Shotgun Laser) were added, bringing the total number of weapon types up to five. A new anti-ground unit bomb was added to the missile inventory.

Though the number of levels was decreased from the previous game, the number of enemies, their durability, and the number of bullets they shoot were greatly increased. Enemy movements and terrain were also made trickier, bringing the game's difficulty up considerably. The same revival system is used as in R-Type, where the player is brought back to a checkpoint whenever their ship is destroyed.

The game consists of six levels. Though an ending screen is displayed after the player finishes all of the levels once through, the game's true ending is only displayed after the player completes the levels a second time under increased difficulty. The game starts off in a ruined Bydo base, and continues through a giant cave where waterfalls can prevent the ship from progressing. The player battles several huge battleships in the third level, and the terrain constantly shifts around during the fourth and fifth levels. The final level takes place on the Bydo home planet, where the alien organisms are cloned and mass-produced.

Ports
R-Type II did not receive any home console ports until 1998, after it had become a retro game; R-Type II for the PC Engine is actually the second half of the original R-Type, while Super R-Type, released in 1991 for the Super Famicom, is only a semi-port of R-Type II. About half of the levels in Super R-Type were newly-created, but some are arranged versions of the levels in R-Type II. The game was released for the Wii Virtual Console on January 29, 2008.

R-Type II for the Amiga is a downgraded though faithful conversion of the original arcade game. It was positively received by magazine critics of the time garnering praise for its accuracy. It was converted by Arc Developments and the graphics were hand-created pixel-by-pixel by in-house graphic artist Jon Harrison. It is missing all the new weapons (search laser, shotgun laser, scatter bomb) and the helper bits have no firing capability. The same goes for the Atari ST version, which misses much gfx and any parallax, but the gameplay and level design remain as faithful to the original as the Amiga version.

The game was also ported to the Game Boy, but the limitations of the hardware caused the content to be changed considerably. The Game Boy version contains only 5 levels, and some of the boss names were changed as well.

The game is coupled with its forerunner in R-Types, which was released for the PlayStation in 1998. This was followed by downloadable releases for the PlayStation Portable and PlayStation 3 over the PlayStation Network. R-Types includes a new opening and ending movie animation, along with "R's Library", which documents some of the game's design settings. A promotional movie for R-Type Delta is included in this release.

Tozai Games ported R-Type II, along with the original R-Type, to the Xbox 360's downloadable service Xbox Live Arcade as R-Type Dimensions in 2009. It is also playable on the Xbox One via backwards compatibility. The title was ported to the PlayStation 3 in 2014. Tozai Games returned in 2018 and issued the collection digitally as R-Type Dimensions EX, on Steam, PlayStation 4 and Nintendo Switch. Strictly Limited Games released physical copies of the PlayStation 4 and Nintendo Switch versions in February 2019. These were limited to 2,000 and 3,000 copies respectively. Collector's Edition variants were issued which contained a hardcover artbook, dog tags, stickers and cards, once again limited to 1,000 on the PlayStation 4 and 2,000 on the Nintendo Switch.

Reception 

The arcade game was successful in Japan, where Game Machine listed R-Type II on their January 1, 1990 issue as being the second most-successful table arcade game at the time.

The arcade game was critically acclaimed. Commodore User reviewed the arcade game, giving it an 86% score.

Notes

References

External links
Official website (Irem) 
Official website (Virtual Console) 

1989 video games
Amiga games
Arcade video games
Atari ST games
Game Boy games
Horizontally scrolling shooters
Multiplayer and single-player video games
PlayStation (console) games
PlayStation Network games
PlayStation Portable games
R-Type
Science fiction video games
Video game sequels
Video games set in the 22nd century
Video games developed in Japan
Video games scored by David Whittaker
Xbox 360 Live Arcade games
Capcom games
Activision games
Android (operating system) games
Arc Developments games